Adrian Shaw (born 17 February 1972) is a first-class and List A cricketer who played for Glamorgan. He was a right-handed batsman and a wicket-keeper, who played with the Glamorgan senior team for thirteen years. Having become the second-team wicketkeeper in 1987, he played with England under-19s as a wicket-keeper with superior batting ability to his colleague Colin Metson.

Previously a rugby player for Neath RFC, he helped Glamorgan to the 1997 County Championship, and in 1999, he hit a career best score of 140, before a groin injury caused him to miss the majority of the 2000 season. Once again, however, after returning from injury, he excelled, managing to catch Brian Lara when the West Indies visited.

He lost his place in the First XI in 2001, before making progress in the Second XI in 2002 and being appointed the Second XI captain. He has most recently been present in the Second XI during the 2006 season, bringing his career full-circle, having begun his second XI tenure nearly eighteen years previously.

References

External links
 Adrian Shaw at Cricket Archive

1972 births
Welsh cricketers
Living people
Glamorgan cricketers
Glamorgan cricket coaches
Neath RFC players
Wales National County cricketers
Wicket-keepers